The Filmfare Best Actor Award is given by the Filmfare magazine as part of its annual Filmfare Awards South for Telugu films. The awards were extended to "Best Actor" in 1972. The year indicates the year of release of the film. Chiranjeevi is the most nominated with 21 nominations and the most awarded with seven times winning the award.

Superlatives 

Chiranjeevi with seven wins, has most awards than any other actor. Mahesh Babu has five wins, followed by Sobhan Babu, Venkatesh and Allu Arjun with four wins. Four actors have won the award thrice in chronological order they are Akkineni Nageswara Rao, Kamal Haasan and Krishnam Raju. Three actors Rajasekhar, N. T. Rama Rao Jr. and Ram Charan has two wins each.
Allu Arjun and Venkatesh are the two actors to win both Filmfare Award for Best Actor – Telugu and Filmfare Critics Award for Best Actor – South.
Allu Arjun have won both Filmfare Award for Best Actor – Telugu and Filmfare Award for Best Supporting Actor – Telugu.
Sobhan Babu was the most victorious actor with four wins in the 70s. Kamal Haasan ruled the 80s with three wins. In the 90s, Chiranjeevi outperformed every other actors with three wins. Chiranjeevi and Mahesh Babu were the two successful actors with two wins each in the 2000s. Mahesh Babu continued to be a most successful actor in the 2010s with three wins.
Two actors have won the awards in consecutive years; in chronological order, they are Sobhan Babu (1974–1976) and Chiranjeevi (1992–1993).
Allu Arjun is the only actor to have won Filmfare Awards South in three different acting categories: Best Actor, Best Supporting Actor and Best Actor – Critics.
Chiranjeevi has the most nominations with 21, followed by Venkatesh with 18 and Nagarjuna with 16.

Multiple Winners 
 7 Wins : Chiranjeevi
 5 Wins : Mahesh Babu
 4 Wins : Sobhan Babu, Venkatesh,  Allu Arjun
 3 Wins : Akkineni Nageswara Rao, Kamal Haasan, Krishnam Raju
 2 Wins : Rajasekhar, N. T. Rama Rao Jr., Ram Charan

Winners

Nominations

1970s 
1972: N. T. Rama Rao – Badi Panthulu
1973: Akkineni Nageswara Rao – Marapurani Manishi
1974: Sobhan Babu – Khaidi Babayi
Krishna – Alluri Seetarama Raju
N. T. Rama Rao – Nippulanti Manishi
1975: Sobhan Babu – Jeevana Jyothi
N. T. Rama Rao – Teerpu
Rao Gopal Rao – Mutyala Muggu
1976: Sobhan Babu – Soggadu
Akkineni Nageswara Rao – Mahakavi Kshetrayya
Krishnam Raju – Bhakta Kannappa
N. T. Rama Rao – Aradhana
Narasimha Raju – Thoorpu Padamara
1977: Krishnam Raju – Amara Deepam
Akkineni Nageswara Rao – Raja Ramesh
Ananth Nag – Prema Lekhalu
N. T. Rama Rao – Adavi Ramudu
Rajinikanth – Chilakamma Cheppindi
1978: Chandra Mohan – Padaharella Vayasu
Akkineni Nageswara Rao – Devadasu Malli Puttadu
Kamal Haasan – Maro Charitra
Krishnam Raju – Mana Voori Pandavulu
1979: Sobhan Babu – Karthika Deepam
Gokina Rama Rao – Punadhirallu
N. T. Rama Rao – Vetagaadu

1980s 
1980: J. V. Somayajulu – Sankarabharanam
Chiranjeevi – Punnami Naagu
M. Prabhakar Reddy – Yuvatharam Kadilindi
Krishnam Raju – Sita Ramulu
Sai Chand – Maa Bhoomi
1981: Kamal Haasan – Aakali Rajyam
Akkineni Nageswara Rao – Premabhishekam
J. V. Somayajulu – Saptapadi
M. Prabhakar Reddy – Palle Pilichindi
N. T. Rama Rao – Kondaveeti Simham
1982: Chiranjeevi – Subhalekha
Akkineni Nageswara Rao – Meghasandesam
Krishnam Raju – Trisulam
N. T. Rama Rao – Bobbili Puli
Sobhan Babu – Devata
1983: Kamal Haasan – Sagara Sangamam
Chiranjeevi – Khaidi
Krishna – Adavi Simhalu
Krishnam Raju – Dharmaatmudu
Sobhan Babu – Mundadugu
1984: Krishnam Raju – Bobbili Brahmanna
Akkineni Nageswara Rao – Vasantha Geetam
Chiranjeevi – Challenge
Naresh – Srivariki Premalekha
Sobhan Babu – Sampoorna Premayanam
1985: Chiranjeevi – Vijetha
Akkineni Nageswara Rao – Bharyabhartala Bandham
Krishna – Agni Parvatam
Murali Mohan – O Thandri Teerpu
Rajendra Prasad – Preminchu Pelladu
1986: Krishnam Raju – Tandra Paparayudu
Chiranjeevi – Chantabbai
Kamal Haasan – Swati Mutyam
Rajasekhar – Repati Pourulu
Venkatesh – Kaliyuga Pandavulu
1987: Akkineni Nageswara Rao – Aatma Bandhuvulu
Balakrishna – Muvva Gopaludu
Chiranjeevi – Swayam Krushi
Nagarjuna – Majnu
Rajasekhar – Sruthilayalu
Rajendra Prasad – Aha Naa-Pellanta!
1988: Venkatesh – Brahma Puthrudu
Chiranjeevi – Rudraveena
Kallu Chidambaram – Kallu
Krishnam Raju – Antima Teerpu
Nagarjuna – Aakhari Poratam
1989: Kamal Haasan – Indrudu Chandrudu
Akkineni Nageswara Rao – Sutradharulu
Chiranjeevi – Attaku Yamudu Ammayiki Mogudu
Nagarjuna – Geetanjali
Nagarjuna – Siva
Venkatesh – Prema

1990s 
1990: Rajasekhar – Magaadu
Chiranjeevi – Jagadeka Veerudu Athiloka Sundari
Mohan Babu – Alludugaru
Rajendra Prasad – Mama Alludu
Venkatesh – Bobbili Raja
1991: Akkineni Nageswara Rao – Seetharamaiah Gari Manavaralu
Balakrishna – Aditya 369
Chiranjeevi – Gang Leader
Rajendra Prasad – Yerra Mandaram
Venkatesh – Kshana Kshanam
1992: Chiranjeevi – Aapathbandavudu
Chiranjeevi – Gharana Mogudu
Mammootty – Swathi Kiranam
Nagarjuna – Antham
Venkatesh – Chanti
1993: Chiranjeevi – Muta Mesthri
Jagapathi Babu – Gaayam
Rajasekhar – Allari Priyudu
Rajendra Prasad – Mister Pellam
Venkatesh – Abbaigaru
1994: Rajasekhar – Anna
Akkineni Nageswara Rao – Bangaru Kutumbam
Jagapathi Babu – Shubhalagnam
Nagarjuna – Hello Brother
Venkatesh – Muddula Priyudu
1995: Mohan Babu – Peddarayudu
J. D. Chakravarthy – Gulabi
Kamal Haasan – Subha Sankalpam
Nagarjuna – Gharana Bullodu
Naresh – Sogasu Chuda Taramaa?
1996: Venkatesh – Dharma Chakram
Jagapathi Babu – Maavichiguru
Nagarjuna – Ninne Pelladata
Srikanth – Pelli Sandadi
Venkatesh – Sahasa Veerudu Sagara Kanya
1997: Nagarjuna – Annamayya
Chiranjeevi – Master
Jagapathi Babu – Chilakkottudu
Vadde Naveen – Pelli
Venkatesh – Preminchukundam Raa
1998: Venkatesh – Ganesh
Chiranjeevi – Bavagaru Bagunnara?
Nagarjuna – Chandralekha
Pawan Kalyan – Tholi Prema
Prakash Raj – Antahpuram
1999: Chiranjeevi – Sneham Kosam
Balakrishna – Samarasimha Reddy
Pawan Kalyan – Thammudu
Ravi Teja – Nee Kosam
Venkatesh – Raja

2000s 
 2000: Venkatesh – Jayam Manadera
Mohan Babu – Rayalaseema Ramanna Chowdary
Nagarjuna – Azad
Venkatesh – Kalisundam Raa
2001: Uday Kiran – Nuvvu Nenu
Balakrishna – Narasimha Naidu
Mahesh Babu – Murari
Pawan Kalyan – Kushi
2002: Chiranjeevi – Indra
Jr. NTR – Aadi
 Nagarjuna – Santosham
 Uday Kiran – Nee Sneham
2003: Mahesh Babu – Okkadu
Chiranjeevi – Tagore
Jr. NTR – Simhadri
Mahesh Babu – Nijam
Nandamuri Harikrishna – Seetayya
2004: Chiranjeevi – Shankar Dada M.B.B.S.
Allu Arjun – Arya
 Nagarjuna – Mass
Prabhas – Varsham
Rajendra Prasad – Aa Naluguru
2005: Siddharth – Nuvvostanante Nenoddantana
Mahesh Babu – Athadu
Nagarjuna – Super
Prabhas – Chhatrapati
Venkatesh – Sankranti
2006: Mahesh Babu – Pokiri
Jr. NTR – Rakhi
Nagarjuna – Sri Ramadasu
Siddharth – Bommarillu
2007: Jr. NTR – Yamadonga
Allu Arjun – Desamuduru
Rajendra Prasad – Mee Sreyobhilashi
Srikanth – Operation Duryodhana
Venkatesh – Aadavari Matalaku Arthale Verule
2008: Allu Arjun – Parugu
Jr. NTR – Kantri
Pawan Kalyan – Jalsa
Ram – Ready
Ravi Teja – Krishna
2009: Ram Charan – Magadheera
Allu Arjun – Arya 2
Kamal Haasan – Eenadu
 Prabhas – Ek Niranjan
Ravi Teja – Kick

2010s
2010: Allu Arjun – Vedam
Balakrishna – Simha
Jr. NTR – Adhurs
Naga Chaitanya – Ye Maaya Chesave
Rana Daggubati – Leader
2011: Mahesh Babu – Dookudu
Balakrishna – Sri Rama Rajyam
Nagarjuna – Rajanna
Prabhas – Mr. Perfect
Ram – Kandireega
2012: Pawan Kalyan – Gabbar Singh
Mahesh Babu – Businessman
Nagarjuna – Damarukam
Nitin – Ishq
Ram Charan – Racha
2013: Mahesh Babu – Seethamma Vakitlo Sirimalle Chettu
Nitin – Gunde Jaari Gallanthayyinde
Pawan Kalyan –  Attarintiki Daredi
Prabhas – Mirchi
Ram Charan – Naayak
2014: Allu Arjun – Race Gurram
Mohan Babu – Rowdy
Nagarjuna – Manam
Sharwanand – Run Raja Run
Venkatesh – Drushyam
2015: Mahesh Babu – Srimanthudu
 Allu Arjun – S/O Satyamurthy
 Jr. NTR – Temper
Nani – Bhale Bhale Magadivoy
Prabhas – Baahubali: The Beginning
2016:Jr. NTR – Nannaku Prematho
Allu Arjun – Sarrainodu
Naga Chaitanya – Premam
Nagarjuna – Oopiri
Nani – Gentleman
Ram Charan – Dhruva
2017:Vijay Devarakonda – Arjun Reddy
Balakrishna – Gautamiputra Satakarni
Chiranjeevi – Khaidi No. 150
Jr. NTR – Jai Lava Kusa
Prabhas – Baahubali 2: The Conclusion
Venkatesh – Guru
2018:Ram Charan – Rangasthalam
Dulquer Salman – Mahanati
Jr. NTR – Aravinda Sametha Veera Raghava
Mahesh Babu – Bharat Ane Nenu
Vijay Devarakonda – Geetha Govindam

2020s
 2020–2021: Allu Arjun – Pushpa: The Rise
Mahesh Babu – Sarileru Neekevvaru
Naga Chaitanya – Love Story
Nani – Shyam Singha Roy
Naveen Polishetty – Jathi Ratnalu
Rakshit Atluri – Palasa 1978
Vaishnav Tej – Uppena

See also
Filmfare Awards
Telugu Cinema

References

Bibliography

Actor